Tetrapedia  may refer to:
 Tetrapedia (alga), a genus of algae in the family Hydrodictyaceae
 Tetrapedia (bee), a genus of bees in the family Apidae